The  is a Japanese commuter electric multiple unit (EMU) train type operated by Tokyu Corporation in the Tokyo area of Japan. Introduced into service on 16 April 1999 on the Tokyu Toyoko Line as a sole eight-car set, a total of 78 vehicles, which would form 13 six-car sets, were built by Tokyu Car Corporation between 1999 and 2001 for use on Tokyu Meguro Line inter-running services to the Tokyo Metro Namboku Line, Toei Mita Line, and Saitama Rapid Railway Line. There are 26 vehicles on order to lengthen the fleet to eight cars.

Operations
The 3000 series sets are used on Tokyu Meguro Line and Tokyo Metro Namboku Line, Toei Mita Line, and Saitama Rapid Railway Line inter-running services. In March 2023, they will also run on the Tokyu Shin-Yokohama Line, the Sotetsu Shin-Yokohama Line and the Sotetsu Main Line.

Formations
, the fleet consists of 13 six-car sets based at Motosumiyoshi Depot, formed as follows with three motored (M) cars and three unpowered trailer (T) cars.

 The "M" and "M1" cars are each fitted with two single arm pantographs.
 Car 4 is designated as being mildly air-conditioned.

Original 8-car formation

The two M1 cars each had two single-arm pantographs.

Interior
Seating is longitudinal bench seating throughout. Wheelchair spaces are provided in cars 2 and 5.

Driver's cab

History
The first 3000 series set, 3001, entered service in 1999, initially as an eight-car formation used on the Tokyu Toyoko Line. This was subsequently reformed as a six-car set following delivery of the rest of the fleet destined for the Meguro Line. A total of 13 six-car sets (78 vehicles) were built by 2001.

On 26 March 2019, Tokyu Corporation announced that the entire Meguro Line fleet, including the 3000 series fleet, would be lengthened from six cars to eight cars from the first half of fiscal 2022. Six of the additional cars were completed in late March 2022 and transported to Nagatsuta depot. As of February 2023, all sets have been lengthend to eight cars.

References

Electric multiple units of Japan
3000
Train-related introductions in 1999
1500 V DC multiple units of Japan
Tokyu Car multiple units